Muhammad Taha Al-Qaddal (Sudanese Arabic pronunciation: muˈħammad ˈtˤɑhɑ al gaddɑːl; 12 December 1951 – 4 July 2021) was a Sudanese poet. He wrote Arabic lyric poetry in contemporary Sudanese style, and some of his poems were put to music by popular Sudanese singers. Al-Qaddal began his literary career at the end of the 1960s and became known in the early 1980s by expressing social and political messages through his verses. His poetry reflecting the suffering of Sudanese in everyday life found special resonance during the time of the Islamist military governments of the late 1990s and has been popular beyond the Sudanese revolution of 2018/19.

Life and career 
Al-Qaddal was born on December 12, 1951, in the village of Helweh, Gezira State. He first studied medicine, but later graduated in management from the University of Khartoum. At the beginning of his professional life, he worked for Sudan National Television and later as a cultural manager for DAL cultural forum in Khartoum. At the same time, he devoted his time to writing and publicly reciting poetry.

He was known for his courageous and emotional spoken-word poetry in a personal style of poetic quality, as well as for his engaging performances, where he evoked the history and traditions of Sudanese culture. Some of his poems were put to music by popular singers such as Mostafa Sid Ahmed or the musical group Igd al-Jalad.

According to Sudanese literary critic Lemya Shammat, "This won him a prominent seat among Sudanese poets, especially those who write in the Sudanese dialect and have enthralling oral poetic performances, such as Mahjoub Sharif, Himmaid, and Azhari. Al-Gaddal went on to make an enormous contribution to Sudanese poetry, helping shape a poetic tradition that keenly digs into the challenges and sufferings of everyday life and gives voice to the neglected, disadvantaged, and downtrodden."Al-Qaddal died on July 4, 2021, at the age of seventy from symptoms of cancer, in Al-Amal Hospital in Doha, Qatar.

Legacy 
On 22 October 2021, the 16th Khartoum International Book Fair was launched, but came to a premature end a few days later, due to the October 2021 Sudanese coup d'etat. The organisers had prepared a commemoration of Al-Qaddal's work "for his influential poetic mastery, startling images, wordsmithery, and verbal elegance."

See also 
 Sudanese literature
 Arabic literature
 List of Sudanese writers

References

Further reading 

 Babikir, Adil (ed.) (2019). Modern Sudanese Poetry: An Anthology. Lincoln, NE, USA.

External links 

 Poem Om Al Nas (The Mother of the People) spoken by Muhammad Taha Al-Qaddal, and interpreted by Sudanese musicians on YouTube
 Video of memorial concert for Muhammad Taha Al-Qaddal with Igd al-Jallad and other Sudanese artists

1951 births
2021 deaths
20th-century Sudanese poets
21st-century Sudanese poets
University of Khartoum alumni
People from Al Jazirah (state)